Petticoat breeches were voluminously wide, pleated pants, reminiscent of a skirt, worn by men in Western Europe during the 1650s and early 1660s. The very full loose breeches were usually decorated with loops of ribbons on the waist and around the knee.  They were so loose and wide that they became known as petticoat breeches.  They give very much the impression of very baggy loose shorts since they are not gathered at the knee.

They replaced Spanish breeches during the 1650s as the most popular leg wear of most of Western Europe.  By the early 1660s, if they were gathered at the bottom they were called rhinegraves.

References

External links 
 Pieter de Hooch Paintings Two pages of paintings of Dutch men in petticoat breeches by Pieter de Hooch.

History of clothing (Western fashion)
Breeches
Skirts